Dade City is a city in and the county seat of Pasco County, Florida, United States. It is located in the Tampa Bay Area, north east of Tampa and south west of Orlando. The population was 7,275 as of the 2020 census.

The city was named after Maj. Francis L. Dade who served, and was killed in action, during the Second Seminole War.

History
An earlier European-American community known as Fort Dade existed nearby in the 1870s and 1880s. The railroad was constructed a few miles to the east, and business owners chose to relocate a few miles to the east to be near it. The newer town became known as Dade City. The name became official when the Hatton post office was changed to Dade City on December 18, 1884.

Dade City was initially incorporated in 1884 or 1885. That incorporation seems to have been forgotten subsequently, and the city was reincorporated in 1889. When Pasco County was formed from the southern section of Hernando County in 1887, Dade City became the county seat of the new county, first temporarily and later permanently, by a popular vote.

The Pioneer Florida Museum, which opened on Labor Day, 1975, showcases the life of European-American pioneers in Central Florida.  Its artifacts and exhibits include a 1913 locomotive, a Methodist church, a house built before the American Civil War, an old school, and an old train depot from Trilby, Florida.

The Hugh Embry Library, currently located on 4th Street, was started in 1904 when its namesake, then 25, was recovering from an illness. Embry had a strong desire to read, but at that time there was no public library in Dade City. He solicited donations of books from local households, and developed a small library in the Embry home on Church Street. (This is now the site of the U.S. Post Office.) 

His efforts helped generate enthusiasm in the community for a more extensive library, culminating in the development of the Pasco County Library Association in 1905. After Embry's death at the age of 28 due to tuberculosis, the library initially faltered. Efforts of active community members and civic organizations such as the Dade City Woman's Club kept it operating. The library was relocated several times over the next five decades, finally reaching its current location in 1963. The library underwent a complete renovation in the late 1980s. The current  building opening in 1991.

The Crescent Theatre was Dade City's main theater from its opening in 1926, to show movies, until it closed in 1950.  It was located on the northeast corner of South 5th Street and Florida Avenue. The front facade/entry to the original building was preserved while other renovations were made for adaptive reuse. A metal structure was added in the 1990s. Today the building is used as a non-profit Seniors' Services center. 

The Pasco Theater, built as a movie theater on South 7th Street, operated from 1948 until 1999. The Pasco theater has since been demolished.

Lawrence Puckett (1906–1985) settled in Dade City in 1925. He later became involved in politics and served as mayor of Dade City from 1981–1983 and as a member of the Dade City Commission from 1976 until his death in 1985. His recollections of the city were published by the Pasco County Centennial Committee. They date from his arrival as a young man of 19. Puckett describes Dade City before and after the Florida land boom as "a typical southern agriculture area, where the few well-to-do controlled the economy and the poor white folks and Negroes did the work for minimal pay. In other words, folks here were either quite well-to-do or very damn poor". Puckett described Dade City as it existed during the Florida boom, with its various shops, streets, and buildings. Most of these had changed significantly by the time he was writing.

With the Florida land boom, people were streaming into the state, usually sticking to the Eastern Coast. The overall economic effect was to drive up property prices all across the state. For Dade City, Puckett estimated that the top money-making ventures were either real estate, business related to real estate, or the production of moonshine. 

He said that the increase of people and capital into Dade City had a profound effect on its culture:

"Country clubs and golf courses were being constructed with country folks playing golf and dancing the Charleston. Wood lands and grazing lands were developed into subdivisions with side walk &: streets built 9 miles in the woods, which in most cases was about all that happened."

During World War II, the government established a prisoner-of-war camp in Dade City. The prisoners were German soldiers from Field Marshal Erwin Rommel's Afrika Korps, who were captured in battles in North Africa in 1942-1943. They were put to work, producing limestone bricks, building warehouses, and making boxes. The POW camp operated from approximately 1942 to the spring of 1946.  The site has been redeveloped as the Pyracantha Park Civic Center.

Geography

Dade City contains gently rolling topography with elevations from 60ft to 100ft.

Demographics

As of the 2020 United States census, Dade City had a population of 7,275 with 2,433 households. There were 2.83 persons per household. 

By age the population was split with 3.5% were under 5 years old, 20.1% were under 18 years old, and 21.8% were 65 years or older. 52.0% were female persons only.

69.3% of the population was white, 23.5% was black or African American, 0.3% was Asian, 5.2% was two or more races, and 19.9% was Hispanic or Latino. There were 707 veterans living in the city and 7.3% were foreign born persons.

62.0% of the housing units were owner occupied. The median value of those owner-occupied units was $150,700. The median selected monthly owner costs for those with a mortgage was $1,270, and $399 for those without a mortgage. The median gross rent was $1,004.

Arts and Culture
Dade City is popular with tourists for its antique stores, restaurants, and historic architecture, including the Pasco County Courthouse, Hugh Embry Library, and Edwinola. The annual Kumquat Festival is hosted downtown. The festival is to celebrate the tart kumquat, a citrus fruit eaten whole, that the surrounding area produces as a commodity crop.

Downtown
Dade City's downtown is known for its antique shops and restaurants.  It is also the location for the Hugh Embry branch library which is a member of the Pasco County Library Cooperative.

Infrastructure

Major roads

 U.S. Route 98/301 (Gall Boulevard/US 98 Bypass/) is the main road through Dade City running north and south through the city.
 County Road 35 Alternate (Old Lakeland Highway)
 County Road 41 (Fort King Road/17th Street/Meridian Avenue/21st Street/Blanton Road) is an extension of SR 41, which is a hidden state road along US 301 from the Hillsborough County Line and becomes an independent route in Zephyrhills.
 State Road 52 (San Antonio Road/21st Street/Meridian Avenue) is the main east-west road that runs through central Pasco County, from US 19 in Bayonet Point to US 98/301 in Dade City. 
 County Road 52 Alternate (Clinton Avenue)
 County Road 578 (Suwannee Way/21st Street/Lock Street)

Airports
The city is served by Zephyrhills Municipal Airport.

Railroads
Passenger rail service was previously available at the Atlantic Coast Line depot.  Since 2004, the depot is only served by Amtrak's Thruway Motorcoach service to Jacksonville and Lakeland.

CSX Transportation's Wildwood Subdivision provides freight rail service to Dade City.

Local bus service
Pasco County Public Transportation provides local bus service on routes 30 & 31 in Dade City.

Notable People
Martha Barnette, attorney and former president of the American Bar Association
Kurt S. Browning, Republican politician and Superintendent of Schools for Pasco County, Florida 
Dallas Eakins, NHL head coach of the Anaheim Ducks 
Dave Eiland, MLB pitcher for the New York Yankees 
Joey Ivie, American defensive tackle in the United States Football League
Roy Roberts, actor

In popular culture
 In Showtime's TV series Dexter, in the episode "Father Knows Best", Dexter Morgan and his girlfriend Rita go to Dade City to clear out the house of Dexter's recently deceased biological father.
 The 1990 film Edward Scissorhands was filmed in Dade City during the spring of 1990.

References

External links

 City of Dade City
 History of Dade City, Florida
 

 
Cities in Pasco County, Florida
County seats in Florida
Cities in the Tampa Bay area
Cities in Florida
1884 establishments in Florida